Malatestino Malatesta (also  known as Malatesta I (or II) Malatesta, nicknamed Il Guercio (English: the War-ish; the Warlike) or dell'Occhio (English: "of the Eye"); died 14 October 1317) was the lord of Rimini from 1312 until his death.

He was the son of Malatesta da Verucchio, inheriting the lordship after his death. He was also the brother of Gianciotto Malatesta, husband of Francesca da Rimini, and of Paolo Malatesta.

Malatestino is mentioned by Dante in his Inferno (XVII, 48-48; and XVIII, 76-84), described as a tyrant like his father, and as the assassin of Guido del Cassero and Angiolello da Carignano. But there is no historical information on these characters. Dante presents the news as a prophecy by the sower of discord, Pier da Medicina, that they, the best of Fano, must beware of Malatestino I Malatesta, tyrant of Rimini, who will kill them by mazzeratura (drowning in leaded bags) near Cattolica. The lack of any archive source on such an incident made some Dante commentators even think that here Piero wanted to perpetrate his sin as a sower of discord by putting tares between the two of Fano and the lord of Rimini. But Dante's preciseness has more of a taste of revelation and since it is a serious allegation, it may be that, as in other cases, the power of the persons concerned has covered up any mention in contemporary documents.

He was podestà of Cesena (1290–1295), capitano del popolo of Bologna in 1296, podestà of Rimini (1302) and capitano del popolo of Florence (1303). In 1312 he became lord of Rimini, to which he subsequently added Cesena and Jesi.

Malatestino was succeeded laterally by his brother Pandolfo I. The claims of Malatestino's own son Ferrantino would have to wait.

References

Malatesta, Malatesta 1
Malatesta, Malatesta 1
Malatesta, Malatesta 1
Malatesta 1